Hugh V may refer to:

 Hugh V of Lusignan (died 1060)
 Hugh V, Count of Maine, ruled 1069–1072
 Hugh V, Viscount of Châteaudun (died 1180)
 Hugh V, Duke of Burgundy (1294–1315)
 Hugh V of Bas (died 1335)